During the 1914–15 Scottish football season, Celtic competed in the Scottish First Division.

Results

Scottish First Division

Friendly

Charity fundraising match between the Scottish League winners and the 'Rest of the League'.

See also
 Navy and Army War Fund Shield

References

Scottish football championship-winning seasons
Celtic F.C. seasons
Celtic